Rui Frazão (born 6 April 1970) is a Portuguese fencer. He competed in the individual épée event at the 1992 Summer Olympics.

References

External links
 

1970 births
Living people
Portuguese male épée fencers
Olympic fencers of Portugal
Fencers at the 1992 Summer Olympics
Sportspeople from Lisbon